"Weak" is a song by British rock band Skunk Anansie, released as the fourth and final single from their debut album, Paranoid & Sunburnt (1995), on 15 January 1996. The song is one of Skunk Anansie's well known releases, and often a favourite at festivals. Skin performs a slower, more ballad-like version at many of her solo gigs. The song has also been covered by Rod Stewart on his 1998 album, When We Were the New Boys.

Music video
The music video was directed by duo Hammer & Tongs. It is filmed primarily (with cutaways to third party views) from the point of view of a collapsed cameraman in what appears to be an airport hangar. The cameraman collapses behind a car which then drives off to show Skin and the band forming to perform for the offset camera. The recording is interrupted by a little boy who, after being pulled out of the way of the camera abruptly, decides to run off with it and the band gives chase after him.

Track listings
CD single – CD1

CD single – CD2

Charts

Certifications

References

1995 singles
1995 songs
One Little Indian Records singles
Skunk Anansie songs
Songs written by Skin (musician)